Richard Robarts (born 22 September 1944 in Bicknacre, Essex) is a British former racing driver from England. He participated in 4 Formula One World Championship Grands Prix, debuting on 13 January 1974. He scored no championship points.

Robarts began his career in Formula Ford, competing from 1969 to 1972. In 1973 he drove a GRD in Formula Three and shared the Lombard North Central, British Formula 3 championship with Tony Brise.

After paying for an F1 drive with Brabham in 1974, Robarts lost it after three races to the better-funded Rikky von Opel.  He later found a seat with Williams, but before Robarts could start a race, the team gave the opportunity to Tom Belsø instead.  Robarts later raced in Formula 2 before moving on to other series.

Complete Formula One World Championship results
(key)

References

English racing drivers
English Formula One drivers
1944 births
Living people
Brabham Formula One drivers
Williams Formula One drivers
People from the City of Chelmsford
Sportspeople from Essex